The Klang Jaya LRT station is an elevated light rapid transit station in Bandar Bukit Tinggi, Klang, Selangor, Malaysia, forming part of the Shah Alam line.

The station is marked as Station No. 23 along the RM9 billion line project with the line's maintenance depot located in Johan Setia, Klang. The Klang Jaya LRT station is expected to be operational in February 2024 and will have facilities such as Park and Ride, kiosks, restrooms, elevators, taxi stand and feeder bus among others.

Locality landmarks
 Lotus's Klang
 Bandar Bukit Tinggi 1
 Première Hotel
 BBT One Twin Towers
 BBT One Boulevard commercial area
 SK Bandar Bukit Tinggi
 Trio Setia Klang
 Taman Desawan
 Taman Klang Jaya
 Taman Sentosa

References

External links
 Official LRT 3 project website
 LRT 3 project video
 Prasarana Malaysia Berhad, LRT 3 owner
 Première Hotel Klang

Shah Alam Line